Old Parr may refer to:
 Grand Old Parr
 Old Tom Parr